Joseph C. Joyce, executive associate vice president for agriculture and natural resources at the University of Florida is a Jacksonville, Florida native. He earned his B.S. and M.S. degrees from the University of Alabama. He received his Ph.D. from the University of Florida in 1982.

Joyce served as a limnologist with the U.S. Army Corps of Engineers. He was chief of the Corps' nationwide Aquatic Plant Control Operation Support Center and chief of the Natural Resources Management Section of the Corps of Engineers' Jacksonville District. In 1983, he joined the University of Florida's Institute of Food and Agricultural Sciences as director of the UF/IFAS Center for aquatic Plants, building on his background as a trained scientific manager. In 1988, he was appointed director of the UF/IFAS Center for Aquatic and Invasive Plants.

In 1993, Joyce was appointed interim dean for research and in 1994 was named associate vice president for agriculture and natural resources. He continued to serve as interim dean until 1995. He served as associate vice president until February 1998, when he was appointed interim vice president for agriculture and natural resources and served in this capacity until October 1998. In this position, Joyce served as the interim administrative head of IFAS, which includes Florida Agricultural Experiment Station, the Florida Cooperative Extension Service, the College of Agricultural and Life Sciences, the School of forest Resources and Conservation, and portions of the College of Veterinary Medicine. In 1998, Joyce was named executive associate vice president for agriculture and natural resources.

In 2008, he was appointed by Governor Charlie Crist to the Environmental Regulation Commission (ERC).  Joyce also joined the Board of Farm Credit of North Florida.

Joyce has held major leadership positions in professional organizations and has served in numerous leadership and governance roles at the University of Florida. He is also a retired Brigadier General, U.S. Army Reserves.

Education
 Bachelor's degree from the University of Alabama
 Master's degree from the University of Alabama
 Doctorate from the University of Florida

References

University of Florida alumni
Living people
University of Alabama alumni
21st-century American engineers
American limnologists
United States Army Corps of Engineers personnel
United States Army generals
Year of birth missing (living people)